Berberis nepalensis is a shrub in the Berberidaceae described as a species in 1825.

In Chiang Mai Province, Thailand, a species of rust fungus Pucciniosira cornuta (synonym of Gambleola cornuta ) infects Berberis nepalensis.

References

Flora of Nepal
nepalensis
Plants described in 1825